Engel & Joe is a German film directed by  which was released on 25 October 2001.

Cast
Robert Stadlober as Engel
Jana Pallaske as Joe
Lena Sabine Berg as Meret, Joe's mother
Mirko Lang as Alex
Stefanie Mühlhan as Spasti
Nadja Bobyleva as Asi
Heike Brentano as Social worker

References

External links
 

2001 films
2000s German-language films
2001 drama films
Films shot in Cologne
German drama films
2000s German films